Opharus palmeri is a moth of the family Erebidae and the Sub-family Arctiinae. It was described by Herbert Druce in 1909. It is found in Colombia.

References

Opharus
Moths described in 1909
Moths of South America